These are the official results of the Men's 200 metres event at the 2003 IAAF World Championships in Paris, France. There were a total number of 59 participating athletes, with eight qualifying heats, four quarter-finals, two semi-finals and the final held on Friday 29 August 2003 at 21:00h.

On August 27, Troy Douglas, at 40 years, 270 days old, became the oldest ever competitor for the men's 200 m. Two days later, Frank Fredericks became the oldest finalist in the distance, at 35 years, 331 days old.

Final

Semi-final
Held on Thursday 28 August 2003

Quarter-finals
Held on Wednesday 27 August 2003

Heats
Held on Wednesday 27 August 2003

See also
Athletics at the 2003 Pan American Games - Men's 200 metres

References
 

H
200 metres at the World Athletics Championships